Fujian White Crane, also known as White Crane Style is a Southern Chinese martial art that originated in Yongchun County, Fujian province. According to oral tradition, the style was developed by Fang Qiniang (方七娘; Amoy Min Nan: Hng Chhit-niâ), a female martial artist. It is associated with traditional fighting techniques, including long range, but is most similar to close-quarter or hand-to-hand combat. It is most recognizable by the way the fighter imitates a bird's pecking or flapping of wings. While some white crane styles make use of traditional weapons, others have discontinued the use of weaponry.

Fujian White Crane descends in part from Shaolin Boxing and imitates characteristics of the white crane. This system is separate though related to Lohan Quan (Fujian Shaolin). The entire system of fighting was developed from observing the crane's movements, methods of attack and spirit, and may have evolved from the southern Shaolin animal styles.

There is no singular Fujian White Crane system. Multiple branches are collectively referred to as Fujian White Crane, including Sleeping, Crying, Eating, Flying and Shaking Crane styles based on imitative characteristics of their techniques. This group does not include Tibetan White Crane, which developed independently in western and southern China.

History

The legend of the white crane
Qīniáng and her father lived in Yongchun County, Fujian province, where many cranes live. Qīniáng's father knew Southern Chinese martial arts and taught them to his daughter.

One day, while Qīniáng was doing her chores, a crane landed nearby. Qīniáng tried to scare the bird off using a stick and the skills she had learned from her father, but whatever she did, the crane would counter. Qīniáng tried to hit the crane on the head, but the bird moved its head out of the way and blocked the stick with its wings. Qīniáng tried to hit the crane's wings, but the crane stepped to the side and blocked the stick with its claws. Qīniáng tried to poke the crane's body, but the crane dodged backwards and struck the stick with its beak. From then on, Qīniáng carefully studied the crane's movements. She combined these movements with techniques learned from her father, ultimately creating the White Crane Style.

There are many versions of this legend. In some, the crane does not block a stick, but evades and counters it. The point of the style is to emphasize evasion and attack an opponent's vulnerabilities instead of using physical strength. Since it was created by a woman, White Crane fighting elements are especially popular in women's self-defense training because the movements do not require great strength. They more closely imitate the delicate pecking motion associated with this fighting style.

Documented history 
During the Shunzhi period of the Qing Dynasty (1644-1662) lived Fang Zhong (方種 - also known as Fang Zhangguang), a practitioner of Southern Chinese martial arts from Funing Prefecture, Fujian (now Xiapu County). Fang Zhong was from a wealthy family and renowned for excellent fighting skills, having trained with well-known martial arts masters. Fang Zhong lost his wife in his early years, who had given birth to only one daughter, Fāng Qīniáng (方七娘), and Fang Zhong taught his skills to her. According to the traditions of the Lee family branch of Flying Crane, Qiniang was born in the mid-17th century.

Fang Zhong and Fang Qiniang have held various aliases. Fang Zhong is a survivor from the end of the Ming Dynasty and had participated in anti-Qing and Fuming activities, having connections to Hongmen associates. Both have used pseudonyms to avoid being caught by the Qing government due to their anti-Qing activities. "Fangzhang" (方掌) and "Fangzhang" (方種) are believed to be the same person, and "Fangzhangguang" should also be "Fangzhang". "Fang Chung Gong", is a transcript of voice transmission. Fang Zhong also adopted the name "Fang Hui Shi" after defeat of anti-Qing forces.

One day, Qiniang saw a huge crane and attacked it with a stick. As she was unable to defeat it, she realized the crane had come to teach her, and developed her own unique techniques from the experience. Qiniang would modify her father's Nanquan techniques in the way that would serve as basis for what is now known as Fujian White Crane Kung Fu.

She had four principal students who later developed four main branches of Fujian White Crane: Eating, Crying, Sleeping, and Flying. Many systems evolved from each of the four original types of White Crane.

Zeng Si from Yongchun, married Qiniang and had two sons. Zeng Si and Qiniang returned to the Gu family's ancestral hall in Hou Temple, Rulin Village, Wulijie Town, Yongchun County to teach martial arts. Yongchun County is adjacent to Kinmen, which is the threshold for Taiwan. At  the ancestral hall (coaching temple) there are paintings of White Crane Taoist and Zeng Si revered as the first teacher of White Crane.

In the Flying Crane tradition, Fang Qiniang never married, had children or a husband. Rather, she retired in Bai he an (white crane temple) and taught martial arts.

According to the yong chun bai he tradition, the Ong Gong Shr Wushuguan was established in the town of Yongchun (永春; Minnan: eng2 chhun1), prefecture of Quanzhou, Fujian province, when its founders were taught by Fang Qiniang during the reign of the Jiajing Emperor (r. 1521–66) of the Ming dynasty.

Pingyang White Crane was created by Fāng Qī Niáng during Shunzhi period during the Qing dynasty. During Jiaqing period, this kongfu spread to Pingyang city. Yongchun-style White Crane was created by Fāng Qī Niáng during KangXi period during the Qing dynasty.

Li Wenmao, an opera performer and leader of the 1854–1856 Red Turban Rebellion in Foshan, is said to have practiced the Yǒngchūn style of White Crane.

The Xu-Xi Dao style of White Crane as taught by Chen Zhuozhen was derived from Zhong-Ho 'Springing Crane', and was developed in Taiwan by Huang Laoyang in the 1950s.

Branches and schools

Yongchun White Crane in China
The lineage of The Weng Gong Ci Gym in Yongchun County is:
 方掌光 - Fang Zhang Guang
 方七娘 - Fang Qi Niang
 曾四 - Zeng Si
 潘賢 - Pan Xian
 潘堆金 - Pan Dui Jin
 潘賽玉 - Pan Sai Yu, 潘敦池 - Pan Dun Chi, 潘大任 - Pan Da Ren
 潘深恩 - Pan Shen En, 潘月照 - Pan Yue Zhao
 潘利秋 - Pan Li Qiu
 潘貞團 - Pan Zhen Tuan
 潘孝德 - Pan Xiao De
 潘成廟 - Pan Cheng Miao
 潘瓊琪 - Pan Qiong Qi

Feeding Crane in Taiwan
The lineage of Feeding Crane in Taiwan is:
 方七娘 - Fāng Qī Niáng
 曾四叔 - Zēng Sì Chū
 鄭禮叔 - Zhèng Lǐ Shū
 蔡忠叔 - Cài Zhōng Shū
 蔡公頸 - Cài Gōng Jǐng
 林德順 - Lín Dé Shùn
 劉故 - Liú Gù
 劉銀山 - Liú Yín Shān
 劉長益 - Liú Zhǎng Yì (Liu Chang I)

Calling Crane in China
 Lin Shi Xian
 Pan Yu Ba
 Xi Zong Xiang
 LIn Zhen Lan - Chen Shi Ding - Huang Xing Xian
 Lin Jan Hua, Zheng Hui Sheng -Ruan Dong
Lin Yuan Dun - Zheng Xian Qi

Dancing/Shaking Crane in Taiwan
 Fang Qi Niang
 Zheng Li
 Zheng Cong
 Li Seng
 Fang Shi Peng
 Fang Yong Cang
 Lin Guo Zhong
 Huang Xing Xian
 Zheng Xian Qi
 Huang Yi Xiong

Flying Crane

Fang chi-niang
Lee fah hsieng
Lee mah-saw
Lee kiang-kay
Lee joo-Chian
Lorne Bernard

Influence on other styles
Fujian White Crane is one of the constituent styles of Five Ancestors, who, in addition to the various styles of Karate (notably Goju-ryu, Shitō-ryū and Uechi-ryu), use the routine "San Chian" from Fujian White Crane. San Chian is best known by the Japanese pronunciation of its name, Sanchin.

See also
 Chin Na
 Shaolinquan
 Zhang Sanfeng
 Karate
 Kuntao
 Liu Seong Kuntao
 Yongchun County

Notes

References

Sources
 Real Dachengquan, by Li Kang, Beijing Sport University Press 2005 
 Baihemen Shihequan, Liu Gu, co-authored by Su Yuzhang, Wuzhou Publishing House 
 "Taiwan Martial Arts" (33) MOOK 3-Crane Law. 2006 
 Liu Yinshan "Authentic Southern Shaolin Boxing, Secret Boxing White Crane Gate Food Crane Boxing" published by Cheng Meitang in 1983.
 "An Introduction to Shaolin Temple Boxing in Fujian: Into the Crane", Xinxing Publishing House, 1983. 
 Authentic white crane kung fu by Grandmaster Lee joo-chian and master Lorne Bernard, 2021, Kontact Sports inc 
 Bubishi George Alexander  and Secrets of the Bubishi DVD ASIN : B00015400K
 Shaolin white crane kung fu: A rare art revealed By Lorne Bernard.

External links
 White Crane Online - learn Tai Chi online
 White Crane Academy - classes, courses, and workshops in the south of England
 Weng Gong Ci Whu Shu Guan
 Weng Gong Ci Whu Shu Guan International
White Crane Martial Arts
 Southern Crane Kungfu & Tai Chi U.K.
 FuJian White Crane Kung Fu Club
 White Crane Kung Fu
 White Crane Fighting Arts
 All Masters Martial Arts Centre
 Feeding Crane - Taiwan - Liu Chang I
Traditional White Crane Kung Fu (USA) - Dr. Lee's Academy
 White Crane Kung Fu & Tai Chi Club of Scotland
 Mr. Mah Peng Kong - Bai Hu Quan 白 鶴 拳 

Chinese martial arts
Fujian Nanquan
Buddhist martial arts